The 2009 Helpmann Awards for live performance in Australia were presented on 27 July 2009 at the Sydney Opera House. The ceremony was hosted by Jonathan Biggins and Julia Zemiro and was broadcast live on Bio. (Foxtel's biography channel).

Nominees and winners
Winners are listed in bold type.

Theatre

Musicals

Opera and Classical Music

Dance and Physical Theatre

Contemporary Music

Other

Industry Awards

References

External links
Helpmann Awards official site

Helpmann
Helpmann Awards
Helpmann Awards
Helpmann_Awards, 9th
Helpmann_Awards